Dame Carolyn Paula Hamilton DBE (born November 1951) is a barrister who specialises in children's rights. She is also director of Coram Children's Legal Centre, an independent national charity dedicated to the promotion and implementation of children's rights based at the University of Essex. Hamilton has the position of professor at Essex.

Early life and family
Carolyn Paula Hamilton was born in Hendon, London, in November 1951 to David Hamilton (died 2007) and his wife Laura. She has a brother Alan S. Hamilton. Her father escaped Nazi Germany as a boy before the Second World War on the first Kindertransport ship to England and subsequently made a fortune in real estate and fashion. In 2016, a dispute between Carolyn and her brother Alan over the division of their father's estate became the subject of a bitter court case.

Career
Hamilton is a barrister who specialises in children's rights. In 1995 she was appointed director of Coram Children's Legal Centre, an independent national charity dedicated to the promotion and implementation of children's rights based at the University of Essex where Hamilton is a member of the department of law. She was a Consultant on Juvenile Justice to the Office of the High Commissioner for Human Rights from 2001-2003. She was the Child and Family Commissioner for the Legal Services Commission until December 2010.

She was appointed Dame Commander of the Order of the British Empire (DBE) in the 2017 Birthday Honours for services to children's rights.

Selected publications
Family, law and religion. Sweet & Maxwell, London, 1995. 
Family law in Europe. Butterworths, London, 1995. (Kate Standley & David Hodson) 
"Armed conflict: The protection of children under international law", International Journal of Children's Rights, Vol. 5 (1997). (With Tabatha Abu El-Haj)
Bullying: A guide to the law: How to tackle bullying inside and outside school.  (With Lucy Hopegood and Helen Rimington) Children's Legal Centre, 2000. 
"The employment of children", Child and Family Law Quarterly, Vol. 16, No. 2, pp. 135–149, 2004. (With Bob Watt)
International child abduction: Law and practice. Butterworths, London, 2001. (With	Mark Everall, Nigel Lowe & Michael Nicholls)

References

External links 
Carolyn Hamilton on the Third Protocol of the Convention on the Rights of the Child.

1951 births
English barristers
People from Hendon
Children's rights in the United Kingdom
Academics of the University of Essex
Children's rights
Living people
Dames Commander of the Order of the British Empire